Emmanuel Nwabuikwu “Emma” Nnorom (born April 7, 1958) is a Nigerian business executive. He is currently the group chief executive officer of Heirs Holdings, Chairman of Transcorp Hotels Plc and former president and chief executive officer Transnational Corporation of Nigeria Plc (Transcorp Plc). He was appointed to the position in 2014.

Transnational Corporation of Nigeria 
Nnorom has been president and chief executive officer of Transnational Corporation of Nigeria since September 2014.

References 

Nigerian business executives
1958 births
Place of birth missing (living people)
Living people